Balingasa, commonly known as Balintawak and Cloverleaf, is an administrative division in eastern Metro Manila, the Philippines. It is an urban barangay located in Quezon City, at the city's western boundary with Caloocan.

The barangay's borders are defined by EDSA and barangay Unang Sigaw to the north, barangays Pag-Ibig Sa Nayon and Damar to the south, barangay Manresa in the southeast, and barangay Apolinario Samson and Gregorio Araneta Avenue in the east.

History 

During the Spanish colonial era, the area was a densely forested area. Upon the arrival of settlers, through the native kaingin method of slash-and-burn cultivation, the once-forested area was cultivated into fields and farms where different cereals and vegetables were planted. The area was established as a barrio of Caloocan in 1882, with Catalino Magsalin as its first teniente del barrio, also known as the cabeza de barangay.

After the formation of the new Philippine capital of Quezon City, the barrio was incorporated into the new city in 1939 pursuant to Commonwealth Act No. 502, transferring the Caloocan sitios and barrios of Kaingin, Kangkong, La Loma, Malamig, Matalahib, Masambong, San Isidro, San Jose, Santol and Tatalon to Quezon City.

Following the Second World War, the inhabitants of the area rebuilt their houses and man-made artesian wells, locally known as a balon, were dug as a primary source of water. After one such well was dug, crystal-clear spring water came out of the other wells. This well had its base made out of small pieces of stones, known as gasang, and was referred to by the settlers as the balun ng gasang (gasang well). The balun ng gasang became a common byword of households in the area and was often mispronounced as balungasa, until it was later commonly pronounced as balingasa.

The barrio was recognized as a barangay in 1975 by Quezon City mayor Norberto S. Amoranto.

Notable landmarks 
A monument to the Cry of Balintawak or Cry of Pugad Lawin (a lone Katipunero popularly identified with Andres Bonifacio) was erected in the area, which was transferred to another location.

The Balintawak Interchange, a road network shaped like a cloverleaf, connects the regions of South Luzon, Islands in the Visayas-Mindanao and Metro Manila to provinces in the north under the jurisdiction of both Barangays Balingasa and Unang Sigaw.

Also, Skyway Stage 3 runs through the barangay above A. Bonifacio Avenue, connecting South Luzon Expressway (SLEx) and North Luzon Expressway (NLEx) while avoiding the traffic-torn street of Metro Manila.

North Edsa corridor 

Other notable landmarks (mostly along EDSA) include the Balintawak Market, the LRT Balintawak station and transport hubs to and from Downtown Manila, Northern Quezon City, CaMaNava and Bulacan areas.

The Cloverleaf, an Ayala Land estate and the former site of Central Textile Mills purchased in 2013, is predominantly within the area of Balingasa while the rest is under the jurisdiction of Barangay Apolonio Samson. Once fully developed, the township will include Alveo and Avida Land residential condominiums, a Qualimed hospital facility, commercial buildings for Business Process Outsourcing (BPO) locators and Ayala Malls Cloverleaf (opened on October 25, 2017).

Another condominium project, The Celandine project of DMCI Properties, is located just south of The Cloverleaf along A. Bonifacio Avenue.

The entrance to the Manila Electric Company (Meralco) and National Grid Corporation of the Philippines (NGCP) Balintawak substation, which hosts various distribution and transmission lines operated and maintained by Meralco and NGCP such as the Sucat–Paco–Araneta–Balintawak and Hermosa–Duhat–Balintawak transmission lines, is also located along EDSA.

Demography 
As of the 2015 census of the National Statistics Office (Philippines), the population of Barangay Balingasa is 20,609.

Facilities 
The barangay maintains a Quezon City public library, while government-run Balingasa High School is under the Department of Education.

See also 
 Barangays of Quezon City
 Balintawak Interchange
 Cry of Pugad Lawin

References 

Quezon City
Barangays of Quezon City
Barangays of Metro Manila